Swimmer most commonly refers to a participant in:

 Swimming (sport) competition
 Swimming

Swimmer or swimmers may also refer to:

Arts and entertainment

Films
 The Swimmer (1968 film), an American surreal drama film based on John Cheever's story, starring Burt Lancaster
 Swimmers (2005 film), an American independent drama film starring Sarah Paulson, Cherry Jones, and Shawn Hatosy
 Swimmer (2012 film), a Scottish short film
 The Swimmer, a 2021 film by Strand Releasing
 The Swimmers (2022 film), an American drama film

Games
 Swimmer (video game), a 1982 arcade game

Literature
 "The Swimmer" (poem), an 1899 poem by Adam Lindsay Gordon
 "The Swimmer" (short story), a 1964 short story by John Cheever
 The Swimmers, a 2022 novel by Julie Otsuka

Music and dance
 The Swimmers, a four-piece rock band from Philadelphia
 SWMRS, an American punk band
 Swimmer (ballet), a ballet by Yuri Possokhov based on the short story by John Cheever

Albums
 Swimmer (Tennis album), a 2020 album
 Swimmer (The Big Dish album), a 1986 album
 Swimming (Mac Miller album), a 2018 album

Songs
 "Swimmers", by Broken Social Scene from the 2005 album Broken Social Scene
 "The Swimmer", by Sleater-Kinney from the 2000 album All Hands on the Bad One
 "The Swimmer", by Jarrod Alonge from the 2015 album Beating a Dead Horse

People 
 Amanda Swimmer (1921–2018), American Cherokee potter
 Darren Swimmer, American screenwriter and producer
 Ross Swimmer (born 1943), former Special Trustee for American Indians at the U.S. Department of the Interior
 Saul Swimmer (1936–2007), American documentary film director and producer

Technology
 Swimmer (BEAM), a type of aquatic robot

See also 
 Swim (disambiguation)
 Swimming (disambiguation)
 List of swimmers